Villanova station is a SEPTA rapid transit station near the campus of Villanova University in Radnor Township, Pennsylvania. It serves the Norristown High Speed Line (Route 100). Local, Hughes Park Express, and Norristown Express trains stop at Villanova. The station has off-street parking available.

Villanova station lies east of the former Strafford Spur, which was closed by the Philadelphia and Western Railroad in 1956. The former right-of-way between Strafford and Radnor serves as the P&W Bicycle Trail.

Station layout

References

External links

SEPTA Norristown High Speed Line stations
Radnor Township, Delaware County, Pennsylvania
Railway stations in Pennsylvania at university and college campuses
Railway stations in the United States opened in 1907